Roy Foster (July 29, 1945 – March 21, 2008) was an American outfielder in Major League Baseball who played for the Cleveland Indians from  to . Born in Bixby, Oklahoma, he batted .268 with 23 home runs and 60 runs batted in as a 1970 rookie, and received one vote for the American League's Rookie of the Year Award. He was traded along with Frank Coggins and cash from the Milwaukee Brewers to the Indians for Russ Snyder and Max Alvis during spring training on April 4, 1970. He was dealt along with Rich Hand, Mike Paul and Ken Suarez from the Indians to the Texas Rangers for Del Unser, Denny Riddleberger, Terry Ley and Gary Jones at the Winter Meetings on December 2, 1971. Foster died in Tulsa at age 62.

References

External links

1945 births
2008 deaths
People from Bixby, Oklahoma
Major League Baseball left fielders
African-American baseball players
Booker T. Washington High School (Tulsa, Oklahoma) alumni
Cleveland Indians players
Memphis Blues players
Macon Pirates players
Gastonia Pirates players
Kingsport Pirates players
Oklahoma City 89ers players
Tidewater Tides players
Hawaii Islanders players
Baseball players from Oklahoma
20th-century African-American sportspeople
21st-century African-American people